The Kholodnohirsko–Zavodska line is a line of the Kharkiv Metro, serving Kharkiv, the second largest city in Ukraine. The line is the first segment of the Kharkiv Metro system, in operation since 1975.

Geographically, the Kholodnohirsko–Zavodska line cuts Kharkiv on an east–west axis, providing subway access for the industrial districts lining the Moskovskyi Prospect with the city center. Since it is an important transport thoroughfare of both the metro and the city as a whole, the Kholodnohirsko–Zavodska line has the highest passenger traffic of the three lines, having a daily ridership of 545,070 passengers.

History
Construction of a metro system in Kharkiv became evident in 1967, when the Soviet Council of Ministers approved the construction of the system's first line, then referred to as the Sverdlovsko–Zavodska line. Subsequently, construction on the line began on July 15, 1968 near where the Pivdennyi Vokzal station is located. On August 23, 1968, a date symbolic of the 25th anniversary of the liberation of Kharkiv from Nazi German occupation, tunnel construction began near the Radianska station (now Maidan Konstytutsii station).

The first segment of the Kharkiv Metro system was built in relatively difficult hydrogeological situations. Specifically, engineers had to construct the line under two local rivers, the Kharkiv and the Lopan, and under two high traffic rail road stations, Kharkiv-Passenger and Kharkiv-Balashovskyi, respectively. Despite these difficulties, the first segment of the Kholodnohirsko–Zavodska line was finished relatively quickly, and was ready for its grand opening on August 23, 1975.

Heavy rainfall in the summer of 1996 contributed to the flooding of one of the system's first stations, the Tsentralnyi Rynok. During the reconstruction efforts, central vertical columns were added, creating a unique mix of single-vault rounded ceiling supported by numerous columns, which would otherwise be self-supportive. During its reconstruction, which lasted about a year, the station was fully operational and open to the public.

Timeline

Name changes
Following the fall of the Soviet Union in 1991 and the subsequent Ukrainian independence, some of the stations were renamed to more neutral equivalents, sometimes avoiding reference to significant Soviet institutions and their leaders. In addition to the renaming of the line to its current title with the subsequent name change at the Kholodna Hora station, two other stations were renamed, the last of which occurred in 2004.

 Komsomolska (1978–1994) → Marshala Zhukova (1994–2016) →Palats Sportu
 Vulytsia Sverdlova (1975–1995) → Kholodna Hora, named for the city's Kholodna Hora residential neighborhood.
 Industrialna (1978–2004) → Imeni O.S. Maselskoho, named after the Soviet Ukrainian politician Oleksandr Maselskyi.

On 20 November 2015 the station Radianska was renamed Maidan Konstytutsii to comply with decommunization laws

On 17 May 2016, the station Proletarska was renamed to Industrialna to comply with decommunization laws.

On 16 October 2019, the station Moskovskyi Prospekt was renamed to Turboatom also to comply with decommunization laws.

Stations
Most of the stations on the line were constructed shallow near the surface, with exception to the Pivdennyi Vokzal and Ploshcha Konstytutsii stations which were constructed deep underground due to the different elevations and hydrogeological conditions in those areas. Six of the shallow stations consist of a central platform and vaulted ceiling supported by five columns; the other five shallow stations have a single vaulted ceiling with no columns (with exception to Tsentralnyi Rynok). The two deep stations are both pylon stations, in which the central hall is separated by arcades leading to the station platforms.

Transfers
Traditional Soviet metro planning stipulated the creation of the first line (almost always a system's Red Line), which would at some point in the future be expanded and crossed by future planned lines. The Kharkiv Metro is no exception to this traditional planning scheme; the Kholodnohirsko–Zavodska Line was built with the future expansion in mind. Currently, the two transfer stations from the Saltivska line (Blue Line) and the Oleksiivska line (Green Line) are both terminus stations, although a perspective extension would add two subsequent stations to both line segments. Specifically, the Kholodnohirsko–Zavodska line has two transfer stations:

Technical specifications
Just like with the Kyiv Metro, government planning agencies allowed for a maximum of five carriage trains that would fit on the  station platforms without any modification to the station structure. Specifically, 25 five-carriage trains are assigned to serve the Kholodnohirsko–Zavodska line, serviced from the Depot-1 "Moskovske", located between the Turboatom and Palats Sportu stations.

The Kholodnohirsko–Zavodska line was the first metro line in the Soviet Union (and the Kharkiv Metro) to use a unified central time system, produced by the Khronotron factory in former city of Saint Petersburg in modern-day Russia. Before the introduction of this system, all of the stations of the system used an analog clock system, where in the intervals in between train arrivals a full rotation of the clock hand amounted to five minutes.

Future extension
New construction work on the Kholodnohirsko–Zavodska line has not been conducted since the latest five station extension eastwards from the Moskovskyi Prospekt station to the current terminus at Industrialna. However, two future extensions to the line are planned: Zalutyno station westwards from the terminus at Kholodna Hora and Vostochna and Rohanska stations eastwards from the Industrialna station. These extensions are currently only perspective extensions and have been proposed continually since the late 1980s when those areas of the town were being populated.

Currently, the line serves its usefulness as the busiest line of the Kharkiv Metro system, connecting many industrial neighborhoods with the center of town. The Kholodnohirsko–Zavodska line's expansion both westwards and eastwards would be in the long term perspective at least, considering that no official initiative to begin the construction at either ends was outlined in the "Oblast Program of Construction and the Expansion of the Kharkiv Metropoliten, 2007-2012."

Notes

References

Kharkiv Metro lines
Railway lines opened in 1975